Adam Wojciechowski (born 23 June 1980) is a Polish rower. He competed in the men's double sculls event at the 2004 Summer Olympics.

References

External links
 
 

1980 births
Living people
Polish male rowers
Olympic rowers of Poland
Rowers at the 2004 Summer Olympics
Sportspeople from Poznań